Phallostethus dunckeri is a species of fish in the family Phallostethidae. It is endemic to Malaysia.

Environment
Phallostethus dunckeri is recorded to be found in  a freshwater environment within a pelagic depth range. This species is native to a tropical climate.

Distribution
Phallostethus dunckeri is native to the areas of Asia and Malaysia.

Biology
The eggs of Phallostethus dunckeri are fertilised internally and then after laying they are attached to the substrate by adhesive filaments.

Taxonomy and naming
Phallostethus dunckeri is the type species of the genus Phallostethus. It was described by Charles Tate Regan in 1913 with a type locality of the Muar River, Johor in Malaysia. Regan honoured the German ichthyologist Georg Duncker (1870-1953) of the Zoologisches Museum Hamburg, Duncker initially wrote about this species in 1904 but he was too busy to write a description so he passed some of his specimens on to Regan for him to describe.

References

</ref>

Endemic fauna of Malaysia
Freshwater fish of Malaysia
dunckeri
Taxa named by Charles Tate Regan
Taxonomy articles created by Polbot
Fish described in 1913